Sergio Soto Acéves (born September 8, 1991, in La Piedad, Michoacán) is a Mexican professional footballer who last played for Atlético Estado de México. He made his professional debut with La Piedad during an Ascenso MX defeat to Celaya on 21 July 2012.

References

1991 births
Living people
La Piedad footballers
Loros UdeC footballers
Atlético Estado de México players
Ascenso MX players
Liga Premier de México players
Tercera División de México players
Footballers from Michoacán
Mexican footballers
People from La Piedad
Association footballers not categorized by position